Children Playing Before a Statue of Hercules is a 2005 anthology of short stories edited by David Sedaris.

Sedaris published this book in order to support 826NYC, a nonprofit writing and tutoring center in Brooklyn, New York. All of his proceeds, after permission expenses, from Children Playing Before a Statue of Hercules will benefit this organization designed to help students ages six to eighteen develop their writing skills through free writing workshops, publishing projects, and one-on-one help with homework and English-language learning. In the book's epilogue, Sarah Vowell describes 826NYC's work.

The book's title references a painting by Adriaen van der Werff.

Contents
  Introduction by David Sedaris
 "Oh, Joseph, I'm So Tired" by Richard Yates
 "Gryphon" by Charles Baxter
 "Interpreter of Maladies" by Jhumpa Lahiri
 "The Garden Party" by Katherine Mansfield
 "Half A Grapefruit" by Alice Munro
 "Applause, Applause" by Jean Thompson
 "I Know What I'm Doing About All the Attention I've Been Getting" by Frank Gannon
 "Where the Door Is Always Open and the Welcome Mat Is Out" by Patricia Highsmith
 "The Best of Betty" by Jincy Willett
 "Song of the Shirt, 1941" by Dorothy Parker
 "The Girl with the Blackened Eye" by Joyce Carol Oates
 "People Like That Are the Only People Here: Canonical Babbling in Peed Onk" by Lorrie Moore
 "Revelation" by Flannery O'Connor
 "In the Cemetery Where Al Jolson Is Buried" by Amy Hempel
 "Cosmopolitan" by Akhil Sharma
 "Irish Girl" by Tim Johnston
 "Bullet in the Brain" by Tobias Wolff
 Epilogue by Sarah Vowell

External links
 Interview in The Free Times

2005 books
Fiction anthologies
Simon & Schuster books
Works by David Sedaris